Finally Free is a 2012 album by Lebanese-Canadian singer Karl Wolf.

Finally Free may also refer to:

"Finally Free", song from scene 9 of Dream Theater's Metropolis Pt. 2: Scenes from a Memory
"Finally Free", a single by rapper Freeway from his album Philadelphia Freeway 2
"Finally Free", a single by internet personality DeStorm Power featuring Talib Kweli from his upcoming album Be Careful 
"Finally Free", a song by Clearlake from their album Amber
 Featured in Eden Games' 2006 videogame release Test Drive Unlimited
"Finally Free", a song by Nichole Nordeman from her collection album Recollection: The Best of Nichole Nordeman
"Finally Free", a song by Joshua Bassett from season 3 of High School Musical: The Musical: The Series